Norman Batten (April 30, 1893 – November 12, 1928) was an American racecar driver active in the 1920s. He is one of two drivers that won the Indy500 the year before becoming a Rookie in the Indy500, when Norman provided relief help for Peter DePaolo in the 1925 race, before his rookie year of 1926. He died and his body, along with fellow driver Earl Devore, were lost at sea after the sinking of the ocean liner SS Vestris.

On January 9, 1918, in Juliustown, New Jersey, he married Marion Calvin, daughter of Willian John Calvin and Harriet Dimond Kennedy. She was a registered nurse. His wife survived the sinking of the Vestris.

Indianapolis 500 results

In 1925 Batten drove 21 laps of relief for race winner Pete DePaolo.

References

1893 births
1928 deaths
Indianapolis 500 drivers
Sportspeople from East Orange, New Jersey
Racing drivers from New Jersey
AAA Championship Car drivers